was a chargé d'affaires to Vichy France and a diplomat to the Holy See from Japan. He was appointed as a special envoy to the Vatican, and served in this capacity from 1942 to 1945. He was the first diplomatic representative to the Vatican from Japan.

Diplomat to the Holy See
In 1942, the Holy See began de facto diplomatic relations with Japan, though the United States and United Kingdom protested. Ken Harada was made the first Japanese special envoy to the Holy See, and Archbishop Paolo Marella became the Nuncio to Japan. Harada arrived in the Vatican City in April 1942, and was officially received on May 9, 1942. Harada expressed Japan's desire for peace to Pope Pius XII on occasion, a year before Japan agreed to peace. The Japanese government denied that Harada had expressed a willingness for the country to negotiate peace, declaring the report was "so absurd it is not worth the trouble to deny," though people close to the Vatican confirmed that the meeting had occurred.

Upon the end of Harada's appointment, Pope Pius XII knighted Harada into the Order of St. Sylvester.

Harada served as Japan's ambassador to Italy after World War II.

Grand master of the ceremonies
He later obtained a post as the Grand Master of the Ceremonies with the Imperial Household Agency

Bibliography

 (papers of the father, Tasuku Harada, president of Dōshisha University) 
 (item not on sale)

Notes

References

 

 

1973 deaths
Knights of the Order of St. Sylvester
Ambassadors of Japan to Italy
Ambassadors of Japan to the Holy See
1893 births